The Lars J. Fiksdal House is a historic house at 619 West 1st Street in Webster, South Dakota.  It is an architecturally eclectic -story structure, faced in brick, which was built in several stages.  The oldest portion of the house was built in 1881, and reached its present appearance by 1899.  It exhibits elements of a wide variety of architectural style, with asymmetrical and irregular Queen Anne massing, a Colonial Revival wraparound porch, and Gothic Revival arched windows in some of its gable ends.  The main roof cornice features heavy Italianate brackets.  Many of the later alterations the house were made by Lars Fiksdal, a Norwegian immigrant.  The house was converted into apartments in 1937, and is also known as the Fiksdal Apartment House.

The house was listed on the National Register of Historic Places in 1995.

References

Houses on the National Register of Historic Places in South Dakota
Victorian architecture in South Dakota
Houses completed in 1899
Houses in Day County, South Dakota
National Register of Historic Places in Day County, South Dakota